Montmagny-L'Islet is a former provincial electoral district in the Chaudière-Appalaches region of Quebec, Canada that elected members to the National Assembly of Quebec. As of its final election, it included the cities or municipalities of Montmagny, Saint-Jean-Port-Joli, L'Islet, Sainte-Perpétue, Saint-Pamphile and Cap-Saint-Ignace.

It was created for the 1973 election from Montmagny and a part of L'Islet.  Its final election was in 2008.  It disappeared in the 2012 election and the successor electoral district was Côte-du-Sud.

Its territory never changed during its entire existence, despite overall electoral map reforms in 1980, 1985, 1988, 1992 and 2001.

Members of the National Assembly

Election results

|-
 
|Liberal
|Norbert Morin
|align="right"|10,027
|align="right"|51.78
|align="right"|+13.59

|-

|-

|}

|-
 
|Liberal
|Norbert Morin
|align="right"|8,829
|align="right"|38.19
|align="right"|-2.98

|-

|-

|}
* Increase is from UFP

|-
 
|Liberal
|Norbert Morin
|align="right"|9,518
|align="right"|41.17
|align="right"|-4.82

|-

|}

|-
 
|Liberal
|Réal Gauvin
|align="right"|11,047
|align="right"|45.99
|align="right"|+1.63

|}

|-
 
|Liberal
|Réal Gauvin
|align="right"|10,339
|align="right"|44.36
|align="right"|-13.39

|-

|Independent
|Jean-Claude Roy
|align="right"|2,605
|align="right"|11.18
|align="right"|-
|-

|New Democrat
|Gaston Bourget
|align="right"|881
|align="right"|3.78
|align="right"|-
|}

|-
 
|Liberal
|Réal Gauvin
|align="right"|12,688
|align="right"|57.75
|align="right"|-2.77

|-

|}

|-
 
|Liberal
|Réal Gauvin
|align="right"|14,492
|align="right"|60.52
|align="right"|+15.92

|-

|New Democrat
|Louise Saint-Pierre
|align="right"|564
|align="right"|2.35
|align="right"|-
|-

|Independent
|Antonio Cicchetti
|align="right"|500
|align="right"|2.09
|align="right"|-
|-

|Parti indépendantiste
|Alain Raby
|align="right"|199
|align="right"|0.83
|align="right"|-
|-

|Christian socialist
|Réjean Tardif
|align="right"|47
|align="right"|0.20
|align="right"|-
|}

|-
 
|Liberal
|Julien Giasson
|align="right"|11,566
|align="right"|44.60
|align="right"|+7.16
|-

|}

|-
 
|Liberal
|Julien Giasson
|align="right"|9,220
|align="right"|37.44
|align="right"|-14.44
|-

|-

|}

|-
 
|Liberal
|Julien Giasson
|align="right"|11,375
|align="right"|51.88
|-

|-

|-

|Parti créditiste
|Yvon-C. Roy
|align="right"|2,227
|align="right"|10.16
|}

References

External links
Information
 Elections Quebec

Election results
 Election results (National Assembly)
 Election results (Elections Quebec)

Maps
 2001 map (Flash)
2001–2011 changes (Flash)
1992–2001 changes (Flash)
 Electoral map of Chaudières-Appalaches region (as of 2001)
 Quebec electoral map, 2001

Montmagny, Quebec
Former provincial electoral districts of Quebec